Dibrugarh Airport , is a domestic airport serving the city of Dibrugarh, Assam, India. The airport covers an area of 386 acres. There are 2 aerobridges linked with the terminal. The runway of the airport is capable of handling aircraft like Airbus A320 and Boeing 737.

History
The airport was established in early 1950s. In February 2009, a new terminal building was opened which can handle 500 passengers at a time.

Statistics

Airlines and destinations

Statistics

Gallery

References

External links
Dibrugarh Airport at the Airports Authority of India

Airports in Assam
Transport in Dibrugarh
Memorials to Bhupen Hazarika
1950s establishments in Assam
Airports established in the 1950s
20th-century architecture in India